Karde is a small village near the 
 town of Dapoli, in Ratnagiri district, Maharashtra state in western India. The 2011 Census of India recorded a total of 1,097 residents in the village.

Surali Sagar Beach Resort and Surali Wadi Beach Resort are very well known Beach Resorts of the Surali Group of Hotels

References

Villages in Ratnagiri district